Park Na-rae (born on October 25, 1985) is a South Korean comedian, signed to JDB Entertainment.

Early life and education
As a teenager, Park attended . After successfully graduating from Anyang Arts High School, she went on to study at Sangmyung University.

Career
In 2006, Park made her debut on Gag Concert as a comedienne, after successfully auditioning for the 21st class of comedians.

In 2018, Park published a book titled Welcome to Narae Bar. In the same year, she was voted as the runner-up for the Comedian Of The Year Award.

In 2019, Park released a Netflix stand-up comedy special called Park Na-rae: Glamour Warning, making her the first Korean female comedian to do so. Park also hosted that year's SBS Entertainment Awards alongside co-hosts, Kim Seong-joo and Jo Jeong-sik.

Park was invited to take part in the Netflix Is A Joke Fest, taking place from April 27, 2020 through May 3, 2020 at The Wiltern Theatre in Koreatown.

Personal life
Park has an interest in bartending, and has always included a private bar in the design of her homes, calling it Narae Bar. In addition to her career as a comedian, she is also a DJ.

In 2018, ahead of the South Korean local elections and the South Korean by-elections, Park took part in the 613 Vote and Laugh campaign, together with other comedians such as Yoo Jae-seok, Kang Ho-dong and Shin Dong-yup, encouraging the South Korean public to use their vote in the elections.

Philanthropy 
On August 11, 2022, Park donated  to help those affected by the 2022 South Korean floods through the Hope Bridge Korea Disaster Relief Association.

Filmography

Television series

Variety shows

Web shows

Music Video

Awards and nominations

Listicles

References

External links 

1985 births
Living people
South Korean women comedians
South Korean television personalities
People from Mokpo
Sangmyung University alumni
Gag Concert
Anyang Arts High School alumni
Best Variety Performer Female Paeksang Arts Award (television) winners